Mithunam or Midhunam may refer to:
Midhunam, the 11th month of the Malayalam calendar
Mithunam (1993 film), a Malayalam film
Mithunam (2012 film), a Telugu film